The 2007 Irish Classic (often known as the 2007 Lucan Racing Irish Classic for sponsorship and promotion purposes) was a professional non-ranking snooker tournament that took place between 18 and 19 August 2007 at the Raphael's Snooker Club in Dublin, Republic of Ireland.

David Morris won in the final 5–3 against Fergal O'Brien.

Prize fund
The breakdown of prize money for this year is shown below:
Winner: €1,000
Runner-up: €500
Semi-final: €300
Quarter-final €150
Highest break: €200

Main draw

Century breaks
 147  Stuart Bingham
 100  Fergal O'Brien

References

2007
Irish Classic
Classic